Erbessa pyraloides is a moth of the family Notodontidae first described by Francis Walker in 1854. It is found in Brazil, Colombia and Venezuela.

The length of the forewings is 17–19 mm for males.

The larvae have been recorded feeding on Eucalyptus cloeziana, which is an introduced species.

References

Moths described in 1854
Notodontidae of South America